Olave Sinclair of Havera (South Havra) and Brow (died 1573) was an official on Shetland, known as the "foud". He collected taxes due to the Scottish crown. His first name is sometimes written as Oliver, Ola, or Olaf.

Battle of Summerdale
Olave Sinclair was present at the battle of Summerdale in 1529 and in 1539 was given a respite (exemption from prosecution) for the death of John Sinclair, 3rd Earl of Caithness.

Olave Sinclair was probably a close relative of Edward Sinclair of Strome, who was foud of Shetland in the 1530s.

Feud with the MacLeod of Lewis
Olave Sinclair is said to have been blind in one eye, the result of leaping from Sumburgh Head to escape a band of marauders from the Isle of Lewis. A version of the story explains that Sinclair had a quarrel with William MacLeod of Lewis, whose wife had brought him lands in Shetland. Two previous attempts by the MacLeods to seize Sinclair in revenge for William MacLeod's death were foiled by his Fair Isle allies.

Sinclair was involved in the murder of a William Lewis or Lowis and his three servants on Shetland in the silence of night in June 1543. The assailant from Lewis, traditionally described as Hucheon MacLeod, seems to have been Hugh Morrison, brieve of Lewis, of Trotterness, who killed Olave's son, Henry Sinclair, around the year 1551. In October 1564, Mary, Queen of Scots granted Sinclair a remission from prosecution for this crime.

Foud of Shetland

Sinclair was foud or foud depute, the office of foudry was a kind of bailiff or chamberlain of the Lordship of Shetland. He was sometimes called the "foud and chamberlain" or "Sheriff of Shetland". He presided over the Sheriff Court of Shetland held at Laxfirth (near Tingwall Airport) in March 1561. A letter in the Scots language confirming his appointment on 12 December 1561, calls him the "chamberlane and bailye of oure lordschip and landis of Yeitland, baith maineland and ilis". The word "foud" has a Danish or Norn origin, reflecting the history of the islands.

As foud, Sinclair collected feudal rents in money and farm produce due to the Scottish crown and sent them to Edinburgh. Rents typically included dairy produce, and the butter, known as the "fat goods" was barrelled in Kirkwall on Orkney and shipped to Leith. The goods were sold by the queen's argentar Alexander Durham to contribute to the household expenses of Mary, Queen of Scots. Andrew Lamb of Leith and Southtyre was one of Sinclair's merchant contacts.

Orkney produce was recognised in Scottish court culture. In December 1566, during an entertainment written by George Buchanan for the baptism of James VI at Stirling Castle, Latin verses were sung by nymphs and satyrs in honour of the food and hosts, and characters represented the Orkney Islands.

Sinclair was the proprietor of several farms. He obtained the south house of Reawick in Sandsting by exchange in 1544. In July 1558, Scottish ships from Aberdeen, the Meikle Swallow and Little Swallow, attacked an English fleet. The Scottish sailors took cattle and other goods belonging to Sinclair on Mousa. Sinclair claimed compensation from the owner Thomas Nicholson in the Edinburgh courts.

Making accounts and issuing permits

Robert Stewart of Strathdon, a half-brother of Mary, Queen of Scots, who later became the Earl of Orkney was given the lands of Orkney and Shetland in 1565. William Murray of Tullibardine, the Comptroller, was appointed as foud. Sinclair continued in his role and was called the "foud depute". In July 1567, the Privy Council of Scotland asked Sinclair, as a "receiver" of rents, to submit an account for the queen's income in previous years and come to Edinburgh to show it to the lords and auditors of the Scottish exchequer.

Sinclair's receipts were recorded in the Exchequer Rolls prepared for Murray of Tullibardine as Comptroller. In 1566 he returned £1126 Scots and £330 worth of cereal. In 1567, he collected £1159. In subsequent years the Shetland rents were recorded as receipts from Robert Stewart, 1st Earl of Orkney.

Sinclair's official work included writing licences and testimonials in favour of Hanse merchant skippers like Johan Kordes of Bremen who was given a permit to use the haven of Baltasound in 1560. In August 1563, Sinclair wrote to the burgomaster and town council of Bremen about Kordes and his unlicensed competitors, who were exhausting the island resources. In September 1567, Sinclair prepared a testimonial for Gerdt Hemeling of Bremen whose ship and cargo of salted fish had been taken from his trading base at "Drosteness" by the Earl of Bothwell, who was briefly Duke of Orkney. Sinclair employed a legal clerk or writer called Peter Hog who was the scribe of his official documents and helped Sinclair add his signature with his "hand led on the quill". Hog was called the "Sheriff Clerk of Shetland". Sinclair's servant Henry Nauchty also wrote documents.

Bothwell and Sinclair

A Scottish chronicle, the Diurnal of Occurrents mentions that Bothwell had dinner with Sinclair in Shetland in August 1567 after his flight from the battle of Carberry Hill. The English ambassador in Edinburgh, Nicholas Throckmorton, wrote that Sinclair, the "principal man of the Isle named Fogge", was a supporter of Bothwell, and would help Bothwell escape the pursuing force led by William Kirkcaldy of Grange and Murray of Tullibardine.

In January 1568, Bothwell wrote of his meeting with the Bremen skipper Gerdt Hemeling at Sinclair the receiver's house on Unst. He had hoped that Hemeling's ships and those of a Hamburg trader would join his fleet. Grange and Murray arrived at Unst and disturbed Bothwell's plans. He joined with the Hamburgh merchant at Scalloway and sailed to Norway. Bothwell took the Pelican, one of Hemeling's ships, with him.

Death

Sinclair was discredited by Lord Robert Stewart and his wife Jean Kennedy. He lost his office of foud and was "put to the horn", denounced as bankrupt. At this time he was ill in Kirkcaldy. Sinclair was taken north to Girnigoe Castle in May 1573 where he was unable to speak or move.

Olave Sinclair made his will in 1571 and divided his estates between his three sons according to traditional udal law.

Arthur Sinclair of Eisweck (Eswick) was Sheriff Depute of Shetland in March 1572. Laurence Bruce was appointed tacksman of the foudry in 1571, and was known as the foud. By April 1573, Bruce was "undoubted foud, sheriff depute and chamberlain of Shetland". The House of the Binns near Linlithgow was built in the 17th-century by a merchant Thomas Dalyell whose fortune was founded on the import of Orkney and Shetland butter.

Family
Sinclair's children included:
 William Sinclair of Underhoull on Unst, who married Marjorie or Margaret Stewart (died 1607), a daughter of John Stewart, Commendator of Coldingham and Jean Hepburn. Her second husband was William Bruce of Symbister 
 Henry Sinclair, who was killed in a feud by Hugh Breif alias Hugh Morrison, brieve of Lewis, of Trotterness.
 Matthew Sinclair of Ness, who was murdered in 1602.

One of his sons was contracted to marry Katrine Halkat in 1547. She was a daughter of Robert Halkat, kirk minister of North Maving or Northmavine. A daughter married Richard Leask, who was murdered in a feud by a servant of Henry Sinclair of Sandwick.

References

Court of Mary, Queen of Scots
16th-century Scottish people
1573 deaths
People from Shetland
Monarchy and money
Taxation in Scotland